Thomas Orde-Powlett, 1st Baron Bolton PC (30 August 1746 – 30 July 1807) was an English politician. He was also an amateur etcher, and a cartoonist.

Life
Born Thomas Orde, he was son of John Orde of Morpeth, Northumberland. He was educated at Eton and at King's College, Cambridge, graduating Master of Arts in 1773.

Orde entered politics as Tory Member of Parliament for Aylesbury (1780–1784) and later for Harwich (1784–1796). He served as Secretary to the Treasury (1782–1783) and as Chief Secretary for Ireland (1784–1787). Around 1782, he was appointed to the Privy Council of Ireland, and in 1785, to HM Privy Council. He was Governor of the Isle of Wight (1791–1807) and Lord Lieutenant of Hampshire (1800–1807).

On 7 January 1795, by Royal Licence, he assumed the additional surname of Powlett, and on 20 October 1797 he was created Baron Bolton. His younger brother John Orde was an Admiral in the Navy, and was created a Baronet, of Morpeth in the County of Northumberland, in 1790.

He died in 1807 and was succeeded by his eldest son William, the second Baron, who was MP for Yarmouth (IoW) for a short while.

Family
On 7 April 1778 Orde married Jean Mary Browne-Powlett, the illegitimate daughter of Charles Powlett, 5th Duke of Bolton, who had entailed most of his extensive estates to her in default of male issue of his younger brother Harry Powlett, 6th Duke of Bolton. The latter died without male heirs in 1794, the Dukedom became extinct, and the said inheritance passed to Thomas Orde in right of his wife. The properties with attached farms included Bolton Hall and Bolton Castle in North Yorkshire and Hackwood Park, Old Basing, Hampshire.

References

|-

1740 births
1807 deaths
Alumni of King's College, Cambridge
1
Peers of Great Britain created by George III
British MPs 1780–1784
British MPs 1784–1790
British MPs 1790–1796
Lord-Lieutenants of Hampshire
Orde-Powlett, Thomas
Members of the Privy Council of Great Britain
Members of the Privy Council of Ireland
People from Basingstoke and Deane
People from Morpeth, Northumberland
Irish MPs 1783–1790
Chief Secretaries for Ireland
Members of the Parliament of Ireland (pre-1801) for County Cork constituencies
English engravers
People educated at Eton College